Pierre Kleinheider (born 7 November 1989) is a German footballer who plays as a goalkeeper for FSV 1926 Fernwald.

References

External links

Pierre Kleinheider at Fupa

1989 births
Sportspeople from Offenbach am Main
Footballers from Hesse
Living people
German footballers
Association football goalkeepers
1. FSV Mainz 05 II players
FSV Frankfurt players
Hallescher FC players
Alemannia Aachen players
Chemnitzer FC players
SC Hessen Dreieich players
Regionalliga players
3. Liga players
Hessenliga players